Kenn Nesbitt (born February 20, 1962) is an American children's poet. On June 11, 2013, he was named Children's Poet Laureate by the Poetry Foundation. He was the last one to receive this title before the Poetry Foundation changed its name to Young People's Poet Laureate.

He is a writer of humorous poetry for children, including the books My Hippo Has the Hiccups and Revenge of the Lunch Ladies. Nesbitt has collaborated with poet Linda Knaus on a collection of Christmas poems entitled Santa Got Stuck in the Chimney and with children's musician Eric Herman on several CDs.  His poems also appear in numerous anthologies of humorous children's poetry. Nesbitt's writing often includes imagery of outrageous happenings, before ending on a realistic note. Being children's poems, many make fun of school life. He wrote his first children's poem, "Scrawny Tawny Skinner", in 1994. In 1997, he decided to write his first poetry book, My Foot Fell Asleep, which was published in 1998.

Nesbitt's poem "The Tale of the Sun and the Moon", was used in the 2010 movie Life as We Know It. It was set to music by Eric Herman.

Bibliography 
Nesbitt, K. (2023). I'm Building a Rocket. Collins Big Cat.
Nesbitt, K. (2022). The Elephant Repairman. Purple Room Publishing.
Nesbitt, K. (2021). My Dog Likes to Disco. Purple Room Publishing.
Nesbitt, K. (2020). Pup and Duck: Let's Play Ball. Purple Room Publishing.
Nesbitt, K. (2019). How to Write a Great Poem. Hameray Publishing.
Nesbitt, K. (2019). Deep Sea Dance. Purple Room Publishing.
Nesbitt, K. (2018). My Cat Knows Karate. Purple Room Publishing.
Lewis, J. P. and Nesbitt, K. Bigfoot Is Missing! Chronicle Books.
Nesbitt, K. (2015). Believe it or Not, My Brother Has a Monster. Cartwheel Books.
Nesbitt, K. (2014). The Biggest Burp Ever. Purple Room Publishing.
Nesbitt, K. (2013). Kiss, Kiss, Good Night. Cartwheel Books.
Nesbitt, K. (2012). The Armpit of Doom: Funny Poems for Kids. Purple Room Publishing.
Nesbitt, K. (2012). The Story of the Sun and the Moon. National Geographic School Publishing.
Nesbitt, K. (2012). I'm Growing a Truck in the Garden. Collins Big Cat.
Nesbitt, K. (2011). The Ultimate Top Secret Guide to Taking Over the World. Sourcebooks Jabberwocky.
Nesbitt, K. (2010). More Bears! Sourcebooks Jabberwocky.
Nesbitt, K. (2010). The Tighty-Whitey Spider: And More Wacky Animal Poems I Totally Made Up. Sourcebooks Jabberwocky.
Nesbitt, K. (2009). My Hippo Has the Hiccups: And Other Poems I Totally Made Up. Sourcebooks Jabberwocky.
Nesbitt, K. (2007). Revenge of the Lunch Ladies: The Hilarious Book of School Poetry. Meadowbrook Press. 	
Nesbitt, K. and Knaus, L. (2006). Santa Got Stuck in the Chimney. Meadowbrook Press. 	
Nesbitt, K. (2005). When the Teacher Isn't Looking: And Other Funny School Poems. Meadowbrook Press.
Nesbitt, K. (2001). The Aliens Have Landed! Meadowbrook Press.
Nesbitt, K. (2000). Sailing Off to Singapore Purple Room Publishing.
Nesbitt, K. (1999). I've Seen My Kitchen Sink Purple Room Publishing.
Nesbitt, K. (1998). My Foot Fell Asleep Purple Room Publishing.

Anthologies 
Kenn Nesbitt's poems also appear in the following anthologies.

Nesbitt, K. (2016). One Minute Till Bedtime. Little, Brown Books for Young Readers.
Lansky, B. (2009). What I Did on My Summer Vacation. Meadowbrok Press.
Lansky, B. (2008). I Hope I Don't Strike Out. Meadowbrook Press.
Lansky, B. (2007). I've Been Burping in the Classroom. Meadowbrook Press.
Lansky, B. (2006). Peter, Peter, Pizza Eater. Meadowbrook Press.
Lansky, B. (2006). My Teacher's in Detention. Meadowbrook Press.
(2005). If I Ran the School. Scholastic.
Lansky, B. (2004). If Kids Ruled the School. Meadowbrook Press.
Lansky, B. (2004). Rolling in the Aisles. Meadowbrook Press.
(2004) My Dog Does My Homework. Scholastic.
(2003) I Like it Here at School. Scholastic.
Lansky, B. (1998). Miles of Smiles. Meadowbrook Press.
Lansky, B. (1997). No More Homework! No More Tests!. Meadowbrook Press.
Lansky, B. (1997). A Bad Case of the Giggles. Meadowbrook Press.
Lansky, B. (1991). Kids Pick the Funniest Poems. Meadowbrook Press.

References

External links 
Poetry4kids.com
GigglePoetry.com
Archive of poems at the Poetry Foundation

American male poets
American children's writers
Children's poets
Living people
1962 births
20th-century American poets
20th-century American male writers
21st-century American poets
21st-century American male writers